The Fechheimer & White Building is a historic building located at 233 SW Naito Parkway in Portland, Oregon. Designed by an unknown architect, it was built in 1885 and features cast-iron by Willamette Iron Works. It is adjacent to the Hallock–McMillan Building. In 1975, it was listed as a "primary landmark" in the National Register of Historic Places (NRHP) nomination of the Portland Skidmore/Old Town Historic District, the building's designation subsequently "translated" to "contributing property" under post-1970s NRHP terminology.  The building's year of construction has been given alternatively as 1870, as opposed to 1885. (The National Historic Landmark nomination form for the Skidmore/Old Town Historic District uses both dates for the building, in separate sections, without explanation – an inconsistency.)

References

External links
 
 Fechheimer & White Building (Portland, Oregon), University of Oregon Libraries

1885 establishments in Oregon
Buildings and structures completed in 1885
Buildings and structures in Portland, Oregon
Historic district contributing properties in Oregon
Portland Historic Landmarks
Commercial buildings on the National Register of Historic Places in Oregon